AMOS BASIC is a dialect of the BASIC programming language for the Amiga computer. Following on from the successful STOS BASIC for the Atari ST, AMOS BASIC was written for the Amiga by François Lionet with Constantin Sotiropoulos and published by Europress Software in 1990.

History 
AMOS competed on the Amiga platform with Acid Software's Blitz BASIC. Both BASICs differed from other dialects on different platforms, in that they allowed the easy creation of fairly demanding multimedia software, with full structured code and many high-level functions to load images, animations, sounds and display them in various ways.

The original AMOS was a BASIC interpreter which, whilst working fine, suffered the same disadvantages of any language being run interpretively. By all accounts, AMOS was extremely fast among interpreted languages, being speedy enough that an extension called AMOS 3D could produce playable 3D games even on plain 7 MHz 68000 Amigas. Later, an AMOS compiler was developed that further increased speed. AMOS could also run MC68000 machine code, loaded into a program's memory banks.

To simplify animation of sprites, AMOS included the AMOS Animation Language (AMAL), a compiled sprite scripting language which runs independently of the main AMOS BASIC program. It was also possible to control screen and "rainbow" effects using AMAL scripts. AMAL scripts in effect created CopperLists, small routines executed by the Amiga's Agnus chip.

After the original version of AMOS, Europress released a compiler (AMOS Compiler), and two other versions of the language: Easy AMOS, a simpler version for beginners, and AMOS Professional, a more advanced version with added features, such as a better integrated development environment, ARexx support, a new user interface API and new flow control constructs. Neither of these new versions was significantly more popular than the original AMOS.

AMOS was used mostly to make multimedia software, video games (platformers and graphical adventures) and educational software.

The language was mildly successful within the Amiga community. Its ease of use made it especially attractive to beginners.

Perhaps AMOS BASIC's biggest disadvantage, stemming from its Atari ST lineage, was its incompatibility with the Amiga's operating system functions and interfaces. Instead, AMOS BASIC controlled the computer directly, which caused programs written in it to have a non-standard user interface, and also caused compatibility problems with newer versions of hardware.

Today, the language has declined in popularity along with the Amiga computer for which it was written. Despite this, a small community of enthusiasts are still using it. The source code to AMOS was released around 2001 under a BSD style license by Clickteam, a company that includes the original programmer.

On the 4 April 2019, François Lionet announced the release of AMOS2 on his website amos2.org. AMOS2 replaces STOS and AMOS together, using JavaScript as its code interpreter, making the new development system independent and generally deployed in internet browsers. Amos 2 is now called AOZ Studio.

Software 
Software written using AMOS BASIC includes:

 Miggybyte
 Scorched Tanks
 Games by Vulcan Software, amongst which was the Valhalla trilogy
 Amiga version of Ultimate Domain (called Genesia) by Microïds
 Flight of the Amazon Queen, by Interactive Binary Illusions
 Extreme Violence, included on an Amiga Power cover disk
 Jetstrike, a commercial game by Rasputin Software
 Black Dawn, a 1993 game for the Amiga personal computer

References

External links 
 Source code for AMOS Professional 68000 ASM from pianetaamiga.it (archived, ZIP)
 Source code for AMOS and STOS 68000 ASM from clickteam.com (archived, ZIP)
 The AMOS Factory (an AMOS support/community site)
 Amigacoding website (contains in-depth info and references for AMOS - Archived version 22 Sep 2015)
 History of STOS and AMOS: how they came to be published in the UK
 Amos Professional group on Facebook (one of the members is AMOS' original developer François Lionet)

BASIC programming language family
Video game development software
Amiga development software
Software using the BSD license
Programming languages created in 1990